The Parliament of Wallonia (Walloon Parliament in the decrees) is the legislative body of Wallonia, one of the three self-governing regions of Belgium (the other two being Flanders and the Brussels-Capital Region). The parliament building, the former Hospice Saint-Gilles, is situated in Namur, the capital of Wallonia, at the symbolic confluence of the Meuse and the Sambre, the two main rivers of the most inhabited parts of Wallonia, the Sillon industriel. On the other side of the Meuse, facing the Parliament, is the Élysette, the seat of the Government of Wallonia.

History and names
A 1974 law on the temporary creation of regions installed a Walloon Regional Council (alongside a Flemish Regional Council), which were both abolished in 1977. At the creation of the first (permanent) regional assemblies in 1980 (second state reform), the body was also called "Walloon Regional Council" (Conseil régional wallon). Its members were the national representatives and senators elected in the Walloon Region, who thus by law held two offices simultaneously.

The fourth state reform (1993), transformed Belgium into a federal state and changed the "Walloon Regional Council" (Conseil régional wallon) into the "Council of the Walloon Region" (Conseil de la Région wallonne), which was directly elected for the first time on 21 May 1995. Shortly before these elections, in April 1995, the Council adopted a resolution to use the terms "Walloon Parliament" (Parlement wallon) and "Walloon deputies" (députés wallons).

A 2005 constitutional amendment revised the official terminology for all community and regional councils into community and regional parliaments, changing the "Council of the Walloon Region" into the "Walloon Parliament" (Parlement wallon).

In 2015, the Parliament opted to use the term "Parliament of Wallonia" (Parlement de Wallonie) instead of "Walloon Parliament".

Composition
All members of the Parliament of Wallonia are also members of the Parliament of the French Community, except for German-speaking members (currently  and ) who represent the German-speaking population and are advisory members of the Parliament of the German-speaking Community.

The parliament exercises several functions:
 It discusses and passes decrees, and they can take initiatives to draw them up. After this, decrees are sanctioned and promulgated by the Walloon Government.
 It controls the Walloon Government. Control is exercised via the vote.
 It ratifies the international treaties linked to its powers.

Compositions

2019–2024 (current)

2014–2019
This is the composition of the Walloon Parliament following the 2014 regional election.

2009–2014
This is the composition of the Walloon Parliament following the 2009 regional election. The PS, Ecolo and CDH formed together a government.

2004–2009
This was the composition of the Walloon Parliament following the 2004 regional election. The PS and CDH formed together a government.

1999–2004
This was the composition of the Walloon Parliament following the 1999 regional election. The PS, Ecolo and PRL formed together a government.

1995–1999

1999–2004

2004–2009

2009–2014

2014–2019

2019–present

Constituencies 
The Walloon Parliament is the only Belgian parliament which still uses arrondissement-based constituencies. The federal Chamber of Representatives and the Flemish Parliament both merged theirs into larger province-based constituencies.

A January 2018 law merged both Luxembourg constituencies and reformed the Hainaut constituencies (* = boundaries changed), following a successful challenge by Ecolo to the Constitutional Court that constituencies with too few seats are unrepresentative.

See also 
 Government of Wallonia
 Minister-President of Wallonia
 Flemish Parliament
 Parliament of the Brussels-Capital Region
 Parliament of the French Community
 Parliament of the German-speaking Community

External links
Official Webpage 

 
1980 establishments in Belgium
Politics of Wallonia
Namur (city)
Walloon